Harvey Banks may refer to:
 Harvey Oren Banks (1910–1996), American civil engineer
 Harvey Washington Banks (1923–1979), American professor of physics and astronomy